Rajpal Singh Yadav (born 1958) is an Indian scientist in the field of vector ecology and management at World Health Organization headquarters, Geneva, Switzerland. He has been working with various countries and international organizations to formulate and promote policies for public health pesticide management and vector control.

Early life and education 
Rajpal Singh Yadav was born in Ahir(Yadav) family in Anandpur, Rajasthan, India to Sanskrit scholar Raghuvir Singh Yadav and Mota Devi.
He graduated with a bachelor's degree in Biology in 1977 from the University of Rajasthan, Jaipur, India. Later, from the same university, he received his M.Sc degree in Zoology in 1979 with a University gold medal and received his Ph.D in science in 1984 in the field of insect toxicology, for which he received fellowships of the Council of Scientific and Industrial Research and Indian Council of Medical Research. In 1989, he  finished a certificate course in tropical epidemiology at the College of Public Health, University of the Philippines, Manila. In 1999, he received the British Council Fellowship in health impact assessment of development projects at the Liverpool School of Tropical Medicine, Liverpool, UK.

Career 

After obtaining his Ph.D. in 1984, he joined as a lecturer for a short period in the postgraduate Department of Zoology, Government College Dungarpur, Rajasthan, India. From late 1984 till 2008, he served various positions at the National Institute of Malaria Research (NIMR, previously Malaria Research Center). In 2009, he joined as a scientist in vector ecology and management in the Department of Control of Neglected Tropical Diseases, World Health Organization, Geneva, Switzerland. He also managed several global assignments with the World Health Organization in 2001, 2002, 2004 and 2007. He was founder head of NIMR field centre in Rourkela which he headed from 1988 to 1995 and has served as Deputy Director (Senior Grade) and chief of NIMR field centre  in Nadiad, Gujarat (1996-2008). He has over 28 years of experience in the field of vector bionomics and control, malariology and pesticide management. He contributed to WHO’s normative functions of providing guidance on evaluation of new insecticides for use in public health.

Contribution in Public Health 

During his early career, Dr. Yadav and his team pioneered the integrated approaches for malaria control. Later, he made significant contribution in developing policies and strategies for malaria control in India and South East Asia. He was instrumental in training medical entomologists and public health workers. He organized workshops for intersectoral collaboration in public health and sanitation bringing together non-health and non-governmental sectors. Dr Yadav has led teams in controlling malaria, dengue and chikungunya outbreaks and participated in mitigating many public health emergencies owing to earthquakes and heavy rainfall. His work has taken him across the world including in forested and tribal areas of SE Asia and socio-politically disturbed areas of Africa.

Presently, he is working in a team of the department of control of neglected tropical diseases that manages the WHO Pesticide Evaluation Scheme (WHOPES).

For his outstanding contributions to the field of vector borne disease control, he was bestowed 'Best Scientist Award for Environmental Science 2011' by the National Academy of Vector Borne Diseases, India. Earlier on, he was honored by the Indian Medical Association for his role in malaria control in the Gujarat state.

Publications

Selected Journals

Notes

External links 
 List of Publications of Dr. R.S. Yadav
 List of Publication of Dr. RS Yadav on MRCIndia website
 Citation list of Dr. Yadav's important research papers
 National Advisers at XII International Conference on Vector and Vector Borne Diseases
 WHOPES Working Group Meeting 2011
 WHOPES Working Group Meeting 2009

1958 births
Living people
Indian entomologists
Indian ecologists
University of Rajasthan alumni
Scientists from Rajasthan
20th-century Indian zoologists